This is a list of airports in the Maldives, grouped by type and sorted by location.

The Maldives or Maldive Islands, officially the Republic of Maldives, is an island country in the Indian Ocean formed by a double chain of 26 atolls stretching in a north–south direction off India's Lakshadweep islands, between Minicoy Island and Chagos Archipelago.

It features 1,192 islets, of which two hundred are inhabited. The Republic of Maldives's capital and largest city is Malé.

Airports 
Airport names shown in bold have scheduled passenger service on commercial airlines.

See also 

 Transport in the Maldives
 List of airports by ICAO code: V#VR - Maldives
 List of airlines of the Maldives
 Wikipedia: Airline destination lists: Asia#Maldives

References

External links
 Maldives Airports Co. Ltd., official site
 
 
 
 AIR PORTS in the Maldives. World Aero Data.
 Airports in the Maldives. The Airport Guide.
 Airports in the Maldives. Great Circle Mapper.
 Airports in the Maldives. Flightradar24 database.

Maldives
Airports
Maldives
Airports